San Piero may refer to:
 San Piero a Sieve, frazione of Scarperia e San Piero, Metropolitan City of Florence, Tuscany, Italy
 San Piero Patti, municipality in the Metropolitan City of Messina in the Italian region Sicily, Italy
 San Piero a Grado, church in Pisa, Tuscany, Italy

See also

 San Pier (disambiguation)
 San Pietro (disambiguation)
 Piero (disambiguation)